SoroushPlus Messenger is an instant messaging application, developed by Setak Houshmand Sharif, The messenger has Android and iOS versions for phones, and trial versions for Windows, MacOS and Linux

Privacy 
According to the privacy policy, the app stores user information including content of chats, user information such as name, phone number and contacts on their servers. The service also records IP addresses and device information. The terms and conditions promise not to reveal this data to any third parties. The conditions allow users to correct or validate information and delete their account. No mention is made of user's ability to delete their data.

Some sources have criticised the app for its potential use by the Iranian government to monitor citizens.

Soroush popular bug 
Milad Nouri reported a bug in Soroush application in 2018 using which you were able to find any user's phone number. Then as a proof he published Mohammad-Javad Azari Jahromi's phone number.

Terms and conditions 
Membership is dependent on compliance with the laws of the Islamic Republic of Iran. The terms and conditions of the service stipulate that users are not allowed to publish cybercrime, anti-religious, violent and terrorist propaganda, child abuse and theft. The service reserves the right to disable accounts in violation of rules.

Reception and criticism 
Ayatollah Khamenei closed his account on Telegram and telling users to do the same and sign up to the Iranian-produced services including Soroush.

last update 

Soroush's fourth generation is Soroush's latest update. This update is the best update of this software, because it has a better interface and format, an assistant has been added to it (with Soroush Assistant, many things can be done easily, including settings, messages, Calls, calls, etc. You can even talk to this assistant!) And a section called "Post Chin(Time Line)" has been added that contains the best channel posts. These new features, along with fixing previous bugs and increasing its security, caused this update to receive positive responses from users. Some of these features are not available in the iOS version.

References

External links
Soroushplus website

Android (operating system) software
IOS software
Instant messaging clients